N. Dennis (23 January 1929 – 21 June 2013) was a Member of Parliament from Nagercoil constituency. He was elected six times to the Lok Sabha from Nagercoil constituency as an Indian National Congress candidate in 1980, 1984, 1989 and 1991 elections and as a Tamil Maanila Congress (Moopanar) candidate in 1996 and 1998 elections. He died in 2013 after a brief illness.

Early life
He was educated at St. John's College in Palamcottah. He graduated with a MA degree from University College, Calcutta (West Bengal),  Simultaneously he pursued his law studies at Ernakulam Law College and Trivandrum Law College (Kerala).

Public life
 1964-68 : Vice-President, District Congress Committee (Indira)[D.C.C. (I)], Kanyakumari,    President, Town Panchayat, Keezhkulam
 1965-76 : Chairman, Panchayat Union Council, Killiyoor
 1971-76 : Member, Tamil Nadu Legislative Assembly, Member, Estimates Committee,           Member, Rules Committee, Member, Panel of Chairmen
 1972-73 : Associate Member, Delimitation Commission for Parliamentary and Assembly Constituencies
 1975-78 : President, D.C.C. (I), Kanyakumari, Tamil Nadu	
 1980    : Elected to 7th Lok Sabha
 1980-84 : Member, Committee on the Absence of Members from the Sittings of the House, Member, Committee on the Welfare of Scheduled  Castes and Scheduled Tribes, Member, Consultative Committee, Ministry of  Commerce
 1984    : Re-elected to 8th Lok Sabha (2nd term)
 1984-89 : Member, Consultative Committee, Ministry of Industry	
 1985-86 : Member, Committee on Estimates
 1988-95 : Vice-President, Pradesh Congress Committee (Indira) [P.C.C.(I)], Tamil Nadu
 1989    : Re-elected to 9th Lok Sabha (3rd term)
 1990-91 : Member, Committee on Petitions, Member, Consultative Committee, Ministry of Food Processing Industries
 1991    : Re-elected to 10th Lok Sabha (4th term)
 1992    : Member, Consultative Committee, Ministry of Food Processing Industries
 1992-96 : Member, Consultative Committee, Ministry of Agriculture
 1993-94 : Member, Committee on Communications
 1996	  : Re-elected to 11th Lok Sabha (5th term)
 1996-97 : Member, Committee on Home Affairs, Member, Committee on Subordinate Legislation,   Member, Consultative Committee, Ministry of Agriculture
 1998    : Re-elected to 12th Lok Sabha (6th term)
 1998-99 : Member, Committee on External Affairs  and its Sub-Committee-I, Member, Consultative Committee, Ministry of	Communications, Member, Joint Parliamentary Committee on Essential Commodities Act

Social and cultural activities
Working for making provision of transport and drinking water facilities in scarcity areas; got constructed several roads  and provided sanitation facilities in backward areas and 
SC/ST villages; established communal harmony among the different communities and religious sects; and established educational  institutions in different parts of Kanyakumari.

He had been the Member of Parliament of Nagercoil constituency for nearly two decades. He won in this constituency continuously due to the craze for Indian National Congress created due to the remarkable achievements of his senior K. Kamaraj.

Parliament activities 
 Tamil Nadu Budget, 1980-81 - General Discussion, Demands for Grants Tamil Nadu Budget

References 

People from Kanyakumari district
Indian National Congress politicians from Tamil Nadu
2013 deaths
1929 births
India MPs 1980–1984
India MPs 1984–1989
India MPs 1989–1991
India MPs 1991–1996
India MPs 1996–1997
India MPs 1998–1999
Lok Sabha members from Tamil Nadu
Tamil Maanila Congress politicians
Indian National Congress (Organisation) politicians